Here You Come Again is the nineteenth solo studio album by American entertainer Dolly Parton. It was released on October 3, 1977, by RCA Victor. The album was a commercial success, peaking at number 20 on the US Billboard 200 and at number 2 on the Hot Country Albums chart and also being nominated for Favourite Country Album at the American Music Awards. It became Parton's first album to be certified platinum by the Recording Industry Association of America for shipping a million copies. The lead single and title track was also a success, entering the top five of the US Billboard Hot 100 and being nominated for Favourite Country Single at the American Music Awards.

Critical reception

Billboard published a review of the album in the October 17, 1977 issue, which said, "This is by far Parton's most accessible pop crossover attempt. The material she chooses to work with, some by noted authors, others self penned, is delivered in Parton's little girl-sounding vocals. Her sweet-flowing voice becomes more and more likeable on each cut, emitting a warm innocence. The delicate string and horn accompaniment adds to the breezy, more subtle country effect. And the strong guitar work, pedal steel included, doesn't distract from Parton's vocals. Parton's title track single, which she sang on the Rock Awards television broadcast, is a sure bet to crack the Hot 100."

In the October 22, 1977 issue, Cashbox published a review saying, "Dolly's winning ways have convinced more than a few former non-believers that country and western audiences have no right to a monopoly on this songbird's talents. With this album, Dolly takes a giant step into the pop mainstream with a spicy repertoire that features only an occasional banjo or pedal steel lick. But even those who have seen her perform will have to be at least mildly surprised at how naturally proficient Dolly is at jumping into a completely new bag."

Commercial performance
The album peaked at No. 1 on the US Billboard Hot Country LPs chart and No. 20 on the US Billboard 200 chart. In Canada, the album peaked at No. 12 on the RPM Canadian Albums chart.

The album's first single, "Here You Come Again", was released in October 1977 and peaked at No. 1 on the US Billboard Hot Country Singles chart, No. 3 on the US Billboard Hot 100 and No. 2 on the US Billboard Easy Listening chart. In Canada, the single peaked at No. 1 on the RPM Canadian Country Singles chart, No. 7 on the RPM Canadian Singles chart and No. 1 on the RPM Canadian Easy Listening chart. In Australia, the single peaked at No. 10 on the ARIA Top 100 Singles chart. The single also peaked a No. 75 on the OCC UK Singles Chart.

In February 1978, "Two Doors Down" and "It's All Wrong, But It's All Right" were issued as a double A-side single, aimed at the pop and country charts respectively. The version of "Two Doors Down" issued on the single was recorded by Parton in January 1978 and features a more pop sound than the album version. It would replace the original album version on all subsequent pressings of the album. "Two Doors Down" peaked at No. 19 on the US Billboard Hot 100 and No. 12 on the US Billboard Easy Listening chart. In Canada, the single peaked at No. 26 on the RPM Canadian Singles chart and No. 7 on the RPM Canadian Easy Listening chart. "It's All Wrong, But It's All Right" peaked at No. 1 on both the US Billboard Hot Country Singles chart and the RPM Canadian Country Singles chart.

In April 1980, "Me and Little Andy" was released as a single in the UK and it did not chart.

Track listing

Personnel
Adapted from the album liner notes.

Performance
Ben Benay – pedal steel
Harry Bluestone – concertmaster
Nick DeCaro – accordion, background vocals
David Foster – keyboards, synthesizer
Jan Gassman – background vocals
Jay Graydon – pedal steel
Ed Greene – drums
David Hungate – bass
Jim Keltner – percussion
David Lindley – slide guitar
Myrna Matthews – background vocals
Marti McCall – background vocals
Gene Morford – background vocals
Dean Parks – lead guitar, banjo
Dolly Parton – lead vocals, background vocals
Al Perkins – pedal steel
Zedrick Turnbough – background vocals
Dave Wolfert – pedal steel

Production
Nick DeCaro – string arrangements, vocal arrangements
Frank DeCaro – musical contractor, coordinator
Jimmy Getzoff – concertmaster
Don Henderson – assistant engineer
Gary Klein – producer
Charkes Kopplemann – executive producer
Dean Parks – rhythm arrangements
Mike Reese – mastering
Armin Steiner – engineering, remixing
Linda Tyler – assistant engineer
Ian Underwood – synthesizer programming

Other personnel
Ed Caraeff – photography, art direction, design
Michael Manoogian – lettering

Chart positions
Album

Album (Year-End)

Singles

Certifications

Accolades
Academy of Country Music Awards

|-
| 1977
| Here You Come Again
| Album of the Year
|
|-

American Music Awards

|-
|rowspan="2"| 1979
| Here You Come Again
| Favorite Country Album
|
|-
| "Here You Come Again"
| Favorite Country Single
|
|-

Country Music Association Awards

|-
|rowspan="2"| 1978
| Here You Come Again
| Album of the Year
|
|-
| "Here You Come Again"
| Single of the Year
|
|-

20th Annual Grammy Awards

|-
| 1978
| "Here You Come Again"
| Best Pop Performance, Female
|
|-

21st Annual Grammy Awards

|-
| 1979
| Here You Come Again
| Best Country Vocal Performance, Female
|
|-

Nashville Songwriters Association International Awards

|-
| 1979
| "Two Doors Down"
| Songwriter Achievement Award
|
|-

References

Dolly Parton albums
1977 albums
RCA Records albums
Albums produced by Gary Klein (producer)